Aechmea penduliflora is a species of flowering plant in the Bromeliaceae family. It is native to Central America (Costa Rica, Nicaragua, Panama) and northern South America (Venezuela, Brazil, Guyana, Colombia, Peru and Ecuador).

Cultivars
 Aechmea 'RaRu'
 Aechmea 'Valencia'
 Aechmea 'Wally's Wand'

References

penduliflora
Flora of Central America
Flora of South America
Plants described in 1830
Taxa named by Édouard André